Rudno may refer to:

In Poland:
Rudno, Greater Poland Voivodeship, west-central Poland
Rudno, Lesser Poland Voivodeship, south Poland
Rudno Landscape Park, a protected area in Lesser Poland Voivodeship
Rudno, Lower Silesian Voivodeship, south-west Poland
Rudno, Chełm County in Lublin Voivodeship, east Poland
Rudno, Lubartów County in Lublin Voivodeship, east Poland
Rudno, Parczew County in Lublin Voivodeship, east Poland
Rudno, Lubusz Voivodeship, west Poland
Rudno, Mińsk County in Masovian Voivodeship, east-central Poland
Rudno, Otwock County in Masovian Voivodeship, east-central Poland
Rudno, Przysucha County in Masovian Voivodeship, east-central Poland
Rudno, Pomeranian Voivodeship, north Poland
Rudno, Silesian Voivodeship, south Poland
Rudno, Warmian-Masurian Voivodeship, north-east Poland
Rudno, West Pomeranian Voivodeship, north-west Poland
 Rudno, a district of Rudniki, Gdańsk

In Russia:
Rudno, Russia, name of several rural localities in Russia

In Serbia:
Rudno (Kraljevo), a village

In Slovakia:
Rudno, Slovakia, a village in the Žilina region

In Slovenia:
Rudno, Železniki, a village in the Municipality of Železniki, northwestern Slovenia

In Ukraine:
Rudno, Lviv, a town of the Lviv municipality

See also
Rudno Dolne
Rudno Górne
Rudno Jeziorowe
Rudno Kmiece